Made in Sheffield is a documentary film on the history of the music scene in the city of Sheffield, England from 1975 until 1983. The film was directed  Eve Wood and produced by Sheffield Vision and Slackjaw Film in 2001. It features bands such as The Human League, Cabaret Voltaire, Clock DVA, Pulp (who would not find success until 1994), ABC, and Heaven 17.

Bands featured
2.3 
ABC 
Artery 
Cabaret Voltaire 
Clock DVA 
Comsat Angels
Def Leppard
The Extras
The Future
Heaven 17
The Human League
I'm So Hollow
Pulp
The Stuntkites
They Must Be Russians
Vice Versa

References

External links

Made in Sheffield Official website

Documentary films about pop music and musicians
Music in Sheffield
English music history
1970s in Sheffield
1980s in Sheffield
Documentary films about England